Orly-sur-Morin (literally Orly on Morin) is a commune in the Seine-et-Marne department in the Île-de-France region in north-central France.

Demographics
Inhabitants are called Orlysiens.

See also
Communes of the Seine-et-Marne department

References

External links

Official site of Orly-sur-Morin 
1999 Land Use, from IAURIF (Institute for Urban Planning and Development of the Paris-Île-de-France région) 

Communes of Seine-et-Marne